Adriana Live! was a two-day concert tour by American soul/jazz singer-songwriter Adriana Evans, and featured special guest soul singer, Hilz (formerly of Hil St. Soul). Evans performed songs from her latest album, Walking with the Night and a selection of songs from previous album's El Camino  Adriana Evans and ''Nomadic.

Opening acts
Hilz

Set list
 "Hey Now"
 "Love Is All Around"
 "Let You Get Away"
 "Hey Brother"
 "Bluebird"
 "Suddenly"
 "Reality"
 "I Hear Music"
 "Weatherman"
 "Surrender"
 "Looking for Your Love"
 "Seein' Is Believing"
 "Heaven"

Tour dates

References

External links
Camden London Live Music Listings
Grown Folks Music Spotlight – Adriana Evans

2011 concert tours